Annie Monroe is an American actress and musician. She is best known for her role as Chloe in the 2015 dark comedy film Bad Roomies, and for playing the organ in the alternative rock group The Like. In Bad Roomies, she stars alongside actors Tommy Savas and Patrick Renna.

Filmography

References

External links

21st-century American actresses
Living people
Year of birth missing (living people)
American film actresses
Actresses from Los Angeles
The Like members